Armand Arthur Cure (August 1, 1919 – November 28, 2003) was an American professional basketball and football player. He spent one season in each sport, first for the Providence Steam Rollers of the Basketball Association of America (BBA) during the 1946–47 BBA season and later in 1947 during the All-America Football Conference (AAFC) season as a member of the Baltimore Colts. He attended the University of Rhode Island.

BAA career statistics

Regular season

References

External links

1919 births
2003 deaths
American men's basketball players
Baltimore Colts (1947–1950) players
Basketball players from Massachusetts
Forwards (basketball)
Junior college men's basketball coaches in the United States
Players of American football from Massachusetts
Providence Steamrollers players
Rhode Island Rams football players
Rhode Island Rams men's basketball players
Sportspeople from New Bedford, Massachusetts